Cyrtopodion hormozganum is a species of gecko, a lizard in the family Gekkonidae. The species is endemic to Iran.

Geographic range
C. hormozganum is found in Hormozgan Province, Iran.

References

Further reading
Nazarov, Roman A.; Bondarenko, Dmitry A.; Rajabizadeh, Mehdi (2012). "A New Species of Thin-Toed Geckos Cyrtopodion sensu lato (Squamata: Sauria: Gekkonidae) from Hormozgan Province, South Iran". Russian Journal of Herpetology 19 (4): 292-298. (Cyrtopodion hormozganum, new species).

Cyrtopodion
Reptiles described in 2012
Geckos of Iran
Endemic fauna of Iran